The 2010 FIM Dansk Metal Nordic Speedway Grand Prix was the ninth race of the 2010 Speedway Grand Prix season. It took place on 11 September at the Vojens Speedway Center in Vojens, Denmark.

The Nordic Grand Prix was won by Championship leader Pole Tomasz Gollob who scoring maximum 24 points and he beat Dane Kenneth Bjere, World Champion Australian Jason Crump and Dane Nicki Pedersen in the Final.

Riders 
The Speedway Grand Prix Commission nominated Niels Kristian Iversen as Wild Card, and Nicolai Klindt and Patrick Hougaard both as Track Reserves. Injured Emil Sayfutdinov will be replaced by second Qualified Substitutes rider Davey Watt. The Draw was made on September 10 by the FIM Jury President Ilkka Teromaa.
 (3)  Emil Sayfutdinov → (20)  Davey Watt

Heat details

Heat after heat 
 Hancock, Hampel, Harris, Andersen
 Holder, Jonsson, Crump, Watt
 Gollob, Pedersen, Zetterström, Lindgren (Fxu)
 Iversen, Bjerre, Woffinden, Holta (X)
 Gollob, Crump, Harris, Woffinden
 Andersen, Pedersen, Watt, Holta
 Hampel, Jonsson, ZetterströmIversen
 Holder, Bjerre, Hancock, Lindgren
 Zetterström, Bjerre, Harris, Watt
 Crump, Andersen, Iversen, Lindgren
 Gollob, Hampel, Holta, Holder
 Pedersen, Jonsson, Woffinden, Hancock
 Lindgren, Holta, Jonsson, Harris
 Zetterström, Andersen, Holder, Woffinden
 Crump, Bjerre, Hampel, Pedersen
 Gollob, Iversen, Hancock, Watt
 Pedersen, Holder, Harris, Iversen
 Gollob, Bjerre, Jonsson, Andersen
 Hampel, Lindgren, Watt (Fx) Woffinden (Rx)
 Holta, Crump, Hancock, Zetterström
 Semi-Finals
 Gollob, Pedersen, Holder, Zetterström
 Bjerre, Crump, Jonsson, Hampel (R3)
 The Final
 Gollob, Bjerre, Crump, Pedersen

The intermediate classification

See also 
 Motorcycle speedway

References 

Croatia
Speedway Grand Prix of Denmark
2010 in Danish motorsport